Pierre Slock (9 November 1896 – 28 January 1943) was a Belgian wrestler. He competed in the Greco-Roman bantamweight at the 1924 Summer Olympics.

References

External links
 

1896 births
1943 deaths
Olympic wrestlers of Belgium
Wrestlers at the 1924 Summer Olympics
Belgian male sport wrestlers
Place of birth missing
20th-century Belgian people